JLX may refer to:
 JLX (comics), a superhero team
 JetLink Express, a former Kenyan airline